Ditylenchus is a genus of plant pathogenic nematodes.

References 

Tylenchida
Secernentea genera
Agricultural pest nematodes